Chrysogonus (Χρυσόγονος) was a celebrated Athenian flute player, who dressed in a sacred robe pythike stole played to keep the rowers in time, when Alcibiades made his triumphal entry into the Piraeus on his return from banishment in 407 BC. From a conversation between the father of Chrysogonus and Stratonicus, reported by Athenaeus, it seems that Chrysogonus had a brother who was a dramatic poet. Chrysogonus himself was the author of a poem or drama entitled Politeia, which some attributed to Epicharmus.

References

Athenaeus xii. p. 353, d., viii. p. 350, e., xiv. p. 648, d.

Ancient Greek flautists
Ancient Greek poets
5th-century BC Athenians
5th-century BC poets